Saros cycle series 142 for solar eclipses occurs at the Moon's descending node, repeating every 18 years, 11 days, contains 72 events. 41 of these are total eclipses, the longest of which occurs on May 28, 2291 and will last 6 minutes 34 seconds. All eclipses in this series occurs at the Moon's descending node. Unlike Saros 145, this Solar Saros series is also producing young total solar eclipses with less than 3 minutes length until the Solar eclipse of January 27, 2093.

This solar saros is linked to Lunar Saros 135.

Umbral eclipses
Umbral eclipses (annular, total and hybrid) can be further classified as either: 1) Central (two limits), 2) Central (one limit) or 3) Non-Central (one limit). The statistical distribution of these classes in Saros series 142 appears in the following table.

Events

References 
 http://eclipse.gsfc.nasa.gov/SEsaros/SEsaros142.html

External links
Saros cycle 142 - Information and visualization

Solar saros series